Neotephritis staminea is a species of tephritid or fruit flies in the genus Neotephritis of the family Tephritidae.

Distribution
Mexico, Guatemala.

References

Tephritinae
Insects described in 1900
Diptera of North America